Kempthorne is a Cornish surname, and may refer to:

 Allin Kempthorne (born 1972), Cornish actor, writer and comedian
 Dirk Kempthorne (born 1951), American politician
 John Kempthorne (Royal Navy officer) (1620–1679), Cornish admiral
 John Kempthorne (hymnwriter) (1775–1838), Cornish clergyman
 John Augustine Kempthorne (1864–1946), Bishop of Lichfield
 Oscar Kempthorne (1919–2000), British statistician
 Patricia Kempthorne (born 1953), American former First Lady of Idaho

Cornish-language surnames